Neverending Past is a 2018 Montenegrin drama anthology film directed by Andro Martinovic. It was selected as the Montenegrin entry for the Best International Feature Film at the 92nd Academy Awards, but it was not nominated.

Plot
Three stories examine relationships of fathers and sons. They span three eras: near the end of World War II, during the fall of the Berlin Wall, and in the early 1990s after the breakup of Yugoslavia.

Cast
 Lazar Ristovski
 Tihomir Stanic
 Srdjan Grahovac
 Marko Bacovic
 Jovan Krivokapic
 Dubravka Drakic

See also
 List of submissions to the 92nd Academy Awards for Best International Feature Film
 List of Montenegrin submissions for the Academy Award for Best International Feature Film

References

External links
 

2018 films
2018 drama films
Montenegrin drama films
Serbian-language films
Anthology films
Films set in Montenegro
Films set in Yugoslavia